Laura Mae Monique Lindo (born 1976) is a Canadian politician who was elected to the Legislative Assembly of Ontario in the 2018 provincial election. She represents the electoral district of Kitchener Centre as a member of the Ontario New Democratic Party. In January 2023, Lindo announced that she would be stepping down in July to take a position with the philosophy department of the University of Waterloo.

Early life and education
Born in Canada, Lindo's parents immigrated to the country from Jamaica. Her mother Osra Lindo graduated from York University with a bachelor's degree in gender and women's studies at the age of 79. She is the niece of former Ontario MPP and Speaker Alvin Curling. Raised in Scarborough, Lindo has lived in Kitchener since 2014.

Lindo graduated from the University of Toronto with a Bachelor of Arts (BA) degree in philosophy in 1998 followed by a second BA degree in African studies and philosophy from York University. Her Master of Education degree, completed at York, examined Ontario's high school philosophy program. Lindo also holds a Doctor of Philosophy degree in education. She completed her studies at York University in 2011 with a thesis titled "I'm Writing for Freedom!" Mapping Public Discourse on Race in Comedy.

Career
Lindo is Kitchener's first Black MPP. She currently serves as a Member of the Standing Committee on Regulations and Private Bills, and as Critic for Citizenship and Immigration Services and Critic for anti-racism. In 2018, Lindo was named a member of the Ontario NDP's first ever Black Caucus, alongside NDP caucus colleagues Rima Berns-McGown, Faisal Hassan, Jill Andrew and Kevin Yarde. Prior to her election, she worked as Director of Diversity and Equity at Wilfrid Laurier University. In December 2021, she introduced Bill 67, The Racial Equity in Education Systems Act which "embeds anti-racist language into pieces of legislation from kindergarten to grade 12, and all throughout post secondary", saying "when you define it, then it is real".

After the resignation of Ontario NDP leader Andrea Horwath in June 2022 after the party's defeat in the Ontario general election, Lindo was seen as a potential candidate in the subsequent leadership election, but she decided not to run in November.

In January 2023, Lindo announced that she would be stepping down that July to join the University of Waterloo's philosophy department.

Select publications

Election results

References

Living people
Ontario New Democratic Party MPPs
Politicians from Kitchener, Ontario
People from Scarborough, Toronto
Women MPPs in Ontario
21st-century Canadian politicians
21st-century Canadian women politicians
Black Canadian politicians
Black Canadian women
York University alumni
1976 births